= J. E. Lewis =

James Edward Lewis (aka "Los Angeles Noah") was an African-American preacher active in the 1920s and 1930s in Los Angeles, California. He built a number of large wooden arks according to biblical instruction, with the intention of sailing with a crew of missionaries to the West African country of Liberia, there establishing a colony or empire for African Americans fleeing the "wicked ways" of Jim Crow-era America. Over the years he captured the attention of the public and the press, but his vessels were never seaworthy or the ventures failed, one boat sinking within minutes after years of work. Nevertheless, he was known for his seemingly indomitable faith pursuing the unlikely scheme.

His nautical ventures included:

- 1921: Concrete Ark of the Living God which, when launched in 1921, hit bottom, was never seen again
- 1924: Old Navy collier Brutus for passenger trade to Liberia.
- Mexican Chipas for passenger trade to Liberia.
- 1932: "Church of God" Steamship Line with a 4,000 ton old steamship.

Lewis was the self-declared Bishop of the Church of the Living God, President General of the Liberian Steamship Company, General President of the Excelsior Mining Company, Grand Executive President General of the Liberian Universal Ethiopian Promoters of the World.
